A hole opener is a device used to enlarge the borehole during a well drilling operation.
It can be positioned either above the drill bit or above a pilot run inside the existing borehole.

Numerous designs exist, in sizes varying from a couple of inches to above 50". Usages range from hydrocarbon drilling operations to water drilling or horizontal drilling. 

Hole opener arms have to sustain heavy loads during operations and are generally made of high-grade alloy steel, welded onto a solid alloy steel body. Some designs feature replaceable arms, allowing for size changes but decreasing overall robustness.

See also 
Casing cutter
Drilling rig
Driller (oil)
Drag bit
Drill bit
Drilling stabilizer

External links 
 Types of Hole Openers
 Halliburton PDC hole opener

Drilling technology